Swingate is a small English village positioned between of Kimberley and Babbington, in the Broxtowe district, in the county of Nottinghamshire.

History

Demography

Education

External links

Villages in Nottinghamshire
Places in the Borough of Broxtowe